Kim Jin-yi is a South Korean actress and model. She made her debut in the 1990s. She is known for her roles in dramas such as Reset, Cheo Yong and Love in the Moonlight.

Personal life
She and Oh Hee-joong, who is also an actor, are married. They both married at Seoul in 2017.

Filmography

Television series

Film

References

External links 
 

1982 births
Living people
21st-century South Korean actresses
South Korean female models
South Korean television actresses
South Korean film actresses